The Tomahawk Railway  is the trade name employed by Genesee & Wyoming to operate  of railroad in northern Wisconsin.

History
The Tomahawk Railway, currently owned by Genesee & Wyoming has roots dating back to 1891, when the founder, William H. Bradley, organized the Wisconsin & Chippewa Railroad. In 1894, Bradley organized the Marinette, Tomahawk & Western Railway Company, then merged the W&C into the M.T. & W. in 1898. The main purpose of the railroad was to serve the timber and paper mills in the area at that time with its connection to the world via the Milwaukee Road and Soo Line. During the 1960s, the MT&W Railroad made daily runs to Kings Dam, and an occasional run to the boat factory located where the Harley-Davidson Plant is located today. By the late 1970s, the MT&W stopped providing service to Kings Dam and used the tracks there to store boxcars. It continued to provide service to the Owens-Illinois paper mill. In 2005, Genesee & Wyoming bought the railway and renamed it the Tomahawk Railway.

Currently
Currently the Tomahawk Railway operates six miles of track, providing daily service to the pulpboard mill at Wisconsin Dam, owned by Packaging Corporation of America, as well as its own 105,000-square-foot warehouse located in Tomahawk. The TRomahawk Railway handles over eight thousand carloads annually, consisting of coal, chemicals, scrap paper, woodpulp and pulpwood inbound, as well as pulpboard outbound from Wisconsin Dam to its connection with Fox Valley & Lake Superior Railroad at Tomahawk.

Roster
1583 (Ex-83) EMD SW1500
1587 (Ex-87) EMD SW1500

References

External links
Tomahawk Railway official webpage - Genesee and Wyoming website

Transportation in Lincoln County, Wisconsin
Wisconsin railroads
Railway companies established in 2005
2005 establishments in Wisconsin